Malcolm Barnwell (born June 28, 1958) is a former professional American football player who played wide receiver for five seasons for the Washington Redskins, the New Orleans Saints and the Oakland / Los Angeles Raiders. Barnwell was traded by the Raiders to the Redskins on August 26, 1985, in exchange for the Redskins' second-round pick in the 1986 NFL Draft. His best season was 1984, when he totaled 45 receptions for 851 yards, an 18.9 avg. and two touchdowns, all career highs.

In 2019, Barnwell was interviewed for the Raiders official team website, where he talked about being scouted while playing for Virginia Union, a historically black college and being scouted by Raiders legend Willie Brown.

Legal troubles

In June 1986, Barnwell, who had been traded by the Raiders to Washington Redskins after the 1984 season, was arrested and charged with cocaine possession. Barnwell had been a free agent at this point after being released by the New Orleans Saints in December 1985. A warrant on an unrelated matter had already been issued for Barnwell when he was found in a hotel room with $400 worth of cocaine.

References

1958 births
Living people
Sportspeople from Charleston, South Carolina
Players of American football from South Carolina
American football wide receivers
Virginia Union Panthers football players
Oakland Raiders players
Los Angeles Raiders players
Washington Redskins players
New Orleans Saints players